
Sura Quta (Aymara sura dry jiquima, a species of Pachyrhizus, quta lake, "sura lake", hispanicized spellings Sora Kkota, Sora Kota) is a lake west of the Cordillera Real of Bolivia located in the La Paz Department, Los Andes Province, Pukarani Municipality, Wayna Potosí Canton, on the border to Batallas Municipality. It is situated at a height of about 4,491 metres (14,734 ft), about 1.77 km long and 0.7 km at its widest point. Sura Quta lies north east of Taypi Chaka Quta. The lakes are connected  by the Link'u River ("curve river") that flows down from the Cordillera Real towards Lake Titicaca.

See also 
 Allqa Quta
 Ch'iyar Quta
 Jach'a Jawira
 Juri Quta
 Lawrawani Lake
 Kunturiri
 Surikiña River

References

External links 
 Pukarani Municipality population data and map showing Taypi Chaka Quta situated south west of Sura Quta ("Sora Kota")

Lakes of La Paz Department (Bolivia)